William Child (died c. 1398), of New Romney, Kent, was an English politician.

Family
Child may have been the son of Thomas Child of New Romney and Margaret Child née Spite, a daughter of William Spite.

Career
He was a Member (MP) of the Parliament of England for New Romney in January 1377, 1381, October 1383, 1385 and 1395.

References

Year of birth missing
1398 deaths
14th-century English politicians
English MPs January 1377
English MPs 1381
English MPs October 1383
English MPs 1385
English MPs 1395
People from New Romney